"Individuality" is a song by Australian rock band The Screaming Jets. The song was released in June 1999 as the second and single from the band's greatest hits album Hits and Pieces (1999). The song was also included on the band's fifth studio album Scam (2000). The song peaked at number 67 on the ARIA Charts.

Track listing
 CD single
 "Individuality" - 3:58
 "No Way Out" - 2:32
 "Body Bag" - 2:02
 "Individuality" (Original demo version) - 3:51

Charts

Release history

References

1999 songs
1999 singles
The Screaming Jets songs